Danièle Boni-Claverie (born c. 1942) is a journalist and politician in Ivory Coast. She served in the country's cabinet and was founding president of the Union Républicaine pour la démocratie.

She worked as a journalist, becoming chief editor for a newspaper and then head of Radiodiffusion Television Ivoirienne (RTI).

Formerly a member of the Democratic Party of Côte d'Ivoire, Boni-Claverie served as Minister of Communications in the government of Daniel Kablan Duncan from 1993 to 1999. She served as Minister of Women and the Family and Children in the government of Gilbert Aké from 2010 to 2011.

She was arrested in October 2016 after taking part in a demonstration to request that the country's new draft constitution be withdrawn.

References 

1940s births
Living people
Ivorian journalists
Women government ministers of Ivory Coast
Communication ministers of Ivory Coast
Family ministers of Ivory Coast
Women's ministers of Ivory Coast